Reiffenstein is a surname. Notable people with the surname include:

Carl Theodor Reiffenstein (1820–1893), German landscape and architecture painter
George Reiffenstein (1883–1932), Canadian rower 
Johann Friedrich Reiffenstein (1719–1793), German cicerone for grand tourists, painter, antiquarian and agent for art collectors in Rome